The 1962 Critérium du Dauphiné Libéré was the 16th edition of the cycle race and was held from 28 May to 3 June 1962. The race started in Chamonix and finished at Grenoble. The race was won by Raymond Mastrotto of the Gitane–Leroux team.

General classification

References

1962
1962 in French sport
1962 Super Prestige Pernod
May 1962 sports events in Europe
June 1962 sports events in Europe